Czachowski (feminine: Czachowska) is a Polish surname. Notable people with the surname include:

 Dionizy Czachowski (1810–1863), Polish general
 Kazimierz Czachowski (1890–1948), Polish literary critic and historian
 Ludwik Czachowski, Polish ice hockey player
 Piotr Czachowski (born 1966), Polish footballer

Polish-language surnames

pl:Czachowski